Products produced by Siemens

Manufacturing IT
Teamcenter from UGS acquisition
Siemens PLM NX 3D CAD/CAM/CAE
Siemens PLM Solid Edge 3D CAD
Siemens PLM Teamcenter cPDM
Siemens PLM Tecnomatix Digital Manufacturing
OpCenter
SIMATIC IT
CAMSTAR
Opcenter APS (formerly known as Preactor)
IBS
SIMATIC PCS 7 Process Automation System for Process and Hybrid industries
Industrial programmable controls (including Simatic PLC, and Logo! microcontrollers)
COMOS
Spectrum PowerCC
Simcenter STAR-CCM+

Industrial

BRAUMAT Process Control System
Industrial Instrumentation (Sensors and communication)
SIRIUS Controls
SINAMICS & Perfect Harmony drives
SinaSave Energy efficiency and amortization calculation
Electric motors
SIMATIC Controller
SIMATIC Human Machine Interface (HMI)
SIMATIC PCS 7 Distributed Control System (DCS)
SINUMERIK Computerized Numerical Control (CNC)
SIMATIC Automation Designer
SIMATIC WinCC

PCs
1990-1999: Siemens Nixdorf
1999-2009: Fujitsu Siemens Computers - completely divested to Fujitsu

Telecommunications

OpenScape Voice (HiPath 8000)
OpenScape Contact Center (formerly HiPath ProCenter)
OpenStage IP and TDM phones
Telecommunication Service Platform, the TSP 7000
Hicom Trading E
Hicom 300
HiPath
HiQ 8000 Softswitch
HiE 9200 Softswitch
MSR32R
EWSD telephone exchanges
SPX 2000 small digital telephone exchange (rural)
Siemens Gigaset cordless telephones (19% share, Gigaset was sold to Arques Industries)
Siemens Mobile Phones – divested to BenQ in 2005
Radio and core products for 2G and 3G Mobile Networks (GSM, UMTS, ...)

Transportation/Rail
(See also Siemens Mobility)

Combino, ULF, and Avanto trams
Siemens-Duewag U2 LRV – Edmonton Transit System and Calgary Transit – Alberta, Canada
Siemens SD-160 – Edmonton Transit System and Calgary Transit – Alberta, Canada
LHB/Siemens M1/M2/M3 Metro (Pair) – Prague Metro Czech Republic
Siemens-Adtranz LRV
MX3000 Metro car for Oslo (SGP Wien works) – Oslo T-bane, Norway
CAF S4000 Metro – Barcelona Metro
Schindler/Fiat-SIG/Adtranz Cobra Be 4/6 Low Floor LRV – Zurich VBZ
Class H Metro 5001 – Berlin BVG
SWBSiemensr NGT 6D LRV – Bonn, Germany
Eurorunner diesel locomotive
EuroSprinter electric locomotive
C651, Mass Rapid Transit (Singapore)
Siemens Desiro regional train
 ICE and related Velaro, and future ICx intercity trains.
 Transrapid maglev.
Siemens Modular Metro: Siemens Nexas, Melbourne, Australia
EMU321, EMU341 – TRTC, Taipei
VL256 (original from MATRA) – TRTC, Taipei
Kaohsiung Mass Rapid Transit System KMRT
Viaggio and Viaggio Light (for Israel Railways)
Siemens Vectron electric locomotives
Ankara Metro Ankaray Light Metro M1 and M2 cars - with AnsaldoBreda and Adtranz
 Siemens-Duewag SD-400 LRV - Port Authority Transit of Allegheny County, Pittsburgh, Pennsylvania

Siemens Charger - series of diesel-powered passenger locomotives built for the North American market

Control Systems

SiMotion
Siemens SPPA-T2000 Control System (formerly Teleperm XP)
Siemens SPPA-T3000 Control System (For Electrical Power Generation Control)
 Siemens PCS7 (process control system) for Process Industries and Oil & Gas
SiPass Security
SiVeillance Command & Control
SPC Intrusion systems

Healthcare

Computed Tomography

SOMATOM(R) 
SOMATOM(R) 
SOMATOM(R) Force CT 
SOMATOM(R) Definition Flash CT
SOMATOM(R) Definition Edge CT
SOMATOM(R) Definition AS CT
SOMATOM(R) Definition CT
SOMATOM(R) Sensation CT
SOMATOM(R) Emotion CT
SOMATOM(R) Balance CT
SOMATOM(R) Spirit CT
SOMATOM(R) Perspective CT              *SOMATOM (R) Scope CT                *SOMATOM (R) Volume Zoom CT           *SOMATOM (R) Go Top CT

Magnetic Resonance

Magnetom C!, a low field open MRI 
Managed Equipment Services(.35T)
Magnetom C!, a low field open MRI (.35T)
Magnetom Aera 1.5T
Magnetom Avanto, a Tim system MRI (1.5T)
MAGNETOM Essenza, a Tim system MRI (1.5T)
Magnetom Espree, a Tim system, open bore MRI (1.5T)
Magnetom Espree Pink, a Tim system, breast dedicated open bore MRI (1.5T)
Magnetom Sola (1.5T)
Magnetom Altea (1.5T)
Magnetom Amira (1.5T)
Magnetom Sempra (1.5T)
Magnetom Spectra 3T
Magnetom Skyra 3T
Magnetom Trio, A Tim System, ultra high field MRI (3.0T)
Magnetom Verio, A Tim System, ultra high field MRI (3.0T)
Magnetom Lumina (3T)
Magnetom Prisma (3T)
Magnetom Vida (3T)
Magnetom Terra (7T)

Mammography

Mammomat Inspiration
Mammomat Novation
Mammomat Fusion
Mammomat Revelation

Molecular Imaging
Biograph TruePoint PET.CT
Biograph mMR  PET.MR
Symbia TruePoint SPECT-CT.               Biograaph MCt pet-ct

Radiation Oncology
ARTISTE Linear Accelerator
ONCOR Linear Accelerator
Primus Linear Accelerator
KD2 Linear Accelerator
MD2 Linear Accelerator
Mevatron Linear Accelerator

Software
DocuLive, EPR
Dynamics, Multi-modality image review, reporting, and PACS
Siemens Soarian HIS
MagicStore
MagicView 1000
MagicView 300
Syngo Carbon
syngo Imaging XS
syngo.plaza
syngo WebSpace
syngo.via 
syngo classic
syngo Dynamics
syngo Imaging
syngo Workflow
syngo teamplay
syngo.share
syngo Virtual Cockpit

Ultrasound

Acuson Antares Ultrasound
Acuson Cypress Ultrasound
Acuson S2000 Ultrasound
Acuson S3000 Ultrasound
Acuson SC2000 Ultrasound
sonoline adara
sonoline g20
sonoline g40
sonoline g50
sonoline g60
acuson x150
acuson x300
acuson x300 pe
acuson x500

X-Ray
Radiography, Angiography, Fluoroscopy etc.
AXIOM Aristos
AXIOM Artis
AXIOM Iconos
AXIOM Luminos dRF
AXIOM Multix
AXIOM Sensis
Ysio
multimobile 2.5
multimobile 10
multimobile 5c
multimobile 5e
multimobile 5d
multiphos 10
multiphos 15

Other
E.Cam Signature Series Gamma Camera
Mobilett
Advia(R) hematology systems
The Siemens Servo ventilator
Hemastasis
Immunology
eHealth Solutions

Energy

Power Generation

Renewables:
Siemens Wind Power (previously Bonus Energy in Brande, Denmark) : Windturbines, 2.3 MW, gearless (direct drive) 3.0 MW, 3.6 MW, 6.0 MW; onshore and offshore

Power Transmission

Transformers
HVDC
Disconnector
Power Capacitor
Instrument Transformer
SIESTORAGE Energy storage

Infrastructure

Low and Medium Voltage
SENTRON low voltage switchgear, monitoring
SIVACON power distribution boards
ALPHA distribution boards
DELTA switches and sockets
GAMMA Building Control

Building Automation
DESIGO Building Automation
APOGEE Building Automation (PPCL Program)
Synco Living
XLS Firefinder
WinCIS

Fire Safety
CerberusPRO Fire detection system
SINTESO Fire detection system
Sinorix

Other

@ctiveFRIEND

References

Siemens products
List
Technology-related lists